Aleksandra Krunić was the reigning champion, but chose not to defend her title.

Tamara Zidanšek won the title, defeating Magda Linette in the final 6–1, 6–3.

Seeds

Draw

Finals

Top half

Bottom half

External Links
Main Draw

Bol Open - Singles
Croatian Bol Ladies Open